Marek Vančo (born 12 July 1989) is a Czech handball player for HC Elbflorenz and the Czech national team.

References

External links

1989 births
Living people
Czech male handball players
Sportspeople from Karviná
Expatriate handball players
Czech expatriate sportspeople in Germany